Sutherland is a city in O'Brien County, Iowa, United States. The population was 629 at the time of the 2020 census.

History
Sutherland was laid out in 1882. The city was named after the Duke of Sutherland.

Geography
Sutherland is located at  (42.972364, -95.496923).

Demographics

2010 census
As of the census of 2010, there were 649 people, 293 households, and 176 families living in the city. The racial makeup of the city was 98.8% White, 0.2% African American, 0.6% Native American, and 0.5% from two or more races. Hispanic or Latino of any race were 0.6% of the population.

There were 293 households, of which 22.2% had children under the age of 18 living with them, 48.8% were married couples living together, 6.1% had a female householder with no husband present, 5.1% had a male householder with no wife present, and 39.9% were non-families. 36.2% of all households were made up of individuals, and 15.3% had someone living alone who was 65 years of age or older. The average household size was 2.11 and the average family size was 2.68.

The median age in the city was 50.4 years. 19.6% of residents were under the age of 18; 4.1% were between the ages of 18 and 24; 19.1% were from 25 to 44; 31.4% were from 45 to 64; and 25.9% were 65 years of age or older. The gender makeup of the city was 49.2% male and 50.8% female.

2000 census
As of the census of 2000, there were 707 people, 315 households, and 200 families living in the city. The racial makeup of the city was 98.44% White, 0.14% African American, 0.71% Native American, 0.28% from other races, and 0.42% from two or more races. Hispanic or Latino of any race were 0.42% of the population.

There were 315 households, out of which 22.2% had children under the age of 18 living with them, 52.4% were married couples living together, 7.0% had a female householder with no husband present, and 36.5% were non-families. 33.7% of all households were made up of individuals, and 21.3% had someone living alone who was 65 years of age or older. The average household size was 2.15 and the average family size was 2.71.

In the city, the population was spread out, with 20.2% under the age of 18, 5.7% from 18 to 24, 20.5% from 25 to 44, 22.5% from 45 to 64, and 31.1% who were 65 years of age or older. The median age was 47 years. For every 100 females, there were 87.5 males. For every 100 females age 18 and over, there were 82.5 males.

The median income for a household in the city was $31,985, and the median income for a family was $39,250. Males had a median income of $30,000 versus $19,432 for females. The per capita income for the city was $16,345. About 2.0% of families and 3.9% of the population were below the poverty line, including 1.6% of those under age 18 and 3.8% of those age 65 or over.

Education
Sutherland is served by the South O'Brien Community School District. The district was formed on July 1, 1993 by the merger of three school districts: Paullina, Primghar, and Sutherland.

Notable person
Josh Stamer, football player

References

Cities in O'Brien County, Iowa
Cities in Iowa